Karl Wüthrich was a Swiss footballer who played for FC Basel. He played mainly in the position as forward.

Between the years 1915 and 1929 Wüthrich played a total of 202 games for Basel scoring a total of 112 goals. 112 of these games were in the Swiss Serie A and 90 were friendly games. He scored 50 goal in the domestic league, the other 62 were scored during the test games. He scored his first league goal in the Landhof on 10 October 1915 as Basel won 2–1 at home against Biel-Bienne. It was the winning goal.

References

Sources
 Rotblau: Jahrbuch Saison 2017/2018. Publisher: FC Basel Marketing AG. 
 Die ersten 125 Jahre. Publisher: Josef Zindel im Friedrich Reinhardt Verlag, Basel. 
 Verein "Basler Fussballarchiv" Homepage

FC Basel players
Swiss men's footballers
Association football forwards
Year of birth missing
Year of death missing